Arnica longifolia is a North American species of arnica in the sunflower family, known by the common names seep-spring arnica, longleaf arnica and spearleaf arnica. This flowering perennial is native to the forests of western Canada (British Columbia + Alberta) and the western United States (Rocky Mountains, Cascades, Coast Ranges, Sierra Nevada and other mountains of California, Oregon, Washington, Idaho, Nevada, Utah, Wyoming, Colorado, and Montana).

Arnica longifolia is a rhizomatous plant forming large bunching patches of groundcover in moist, cool areas. The foliage is rough, mint-green, and sometimes sticky with glandular secretions. The stems are erect and bear daisylike flower heads with deep yellow ray florets and yellow to reddish or orange disc florets. The fruit is a reddish achene with a small pappus.

References

External links
Jepson Manual Treatment
United States Department of Agriculture Plants Profile

longifolia
Flora of the Northwestern United States
Plants described in 1871
Flora of the Southwestern United States
Flora of Western Canada
Flora without expected TNC conservation status